Manuel Pérez Ruíz (born 18 March 1993) is a Mexican professional footballer who plays as a winger.

Career
Pérez Ruíz made his professional league debut with Club Universidad Nacional on 25 March 2012 against Tigres UANL; it was his only appearance for the first team, spending most of his time with the under-17 and under-20 sides.

On 19 June 2016, Pérez was transferred to Club América.

On 6 May 2017, Pérez scored his first two goals in the Liga MX in a 2–3 loss to Pachuca.

References

External links
 
 

1993 births
Living people
Mexican footballers
Association football midfielders
Club Universidad Nacional footballers
C.F. Pachuca players
Club América footballers
Lobos BUAP footballers
Mineros de Zacatecas players
Liga MX players
Ascenso MX players
Liga Premier de México players
Footballers from Mexico City